The NUST School of Mechanical and Manufacturing Engineering, commonly known by its acronym NUST-SMME, located in Islamabad, Pakistan, is a constituent school offering undergraduate and postgraduate programs in the fields of mechanical and manufacturing engineering. It was founded in 2008.

History
In January 2007 the School started as Institute of Manufacturing Engineering (IME) in a hired accommodation in Sector F-11, Islamabad. The institute was established with funding from Islamic Development Bank. The responsibilities were given to Mr. Fazal Ellahi as Acting Director of the institute to look after the affairs of the Institute and to procure the laboratories equipment. During the same year in May 2007, Dr. Abid Pervaiz Ghuman was appointed as Head of the institute. Simultaneously, during the same month, the institute was renamed as School of Mechanical and Manufacturing Engineering (SMME).

Anticipating delivery of the laboratory equipment and realizing the need for space, the school was allocated a building in H-12 Campus of NUST in 2008, and SMME was also partly moved to the new location. Meanwhile, planning for the launching of Mechanical Engineering at undergraduate and Industrial and Manufacturing Engineering at postgraduate levels was undertaken. The approval of the curriculum was obtained from the Academic Council in 2008.

In August 2009, Abdul Ghafoor was appointed as the head of the School and fully established in the H-12 campus of NUST. In October of the same year, with the induction of 40 undergraduate students of Mechanical Engineering and 13 postgraduate students of Industrial and Manufacturing Engineering, SMME became fully functional.

Since its founding, the School has added more programs and renamed others. SMME has four degree-awarding departments: the Department of Mechanical Engineering, the Department of Design and Manufacturing, the Department of Robotics and Intelligent Machine Engineering and the Department of Biomedical Engineering. The School offers undergraduate programs in Mechanical Engineering and Postgraduate programs in Mechanical, Design and Manufacturing Engineering, Robotics and Intelligent Machine Engineering, and Biomedical Engineering and Sciences. The school faculty is actively engaged in academic and industrial research. Dr Javaid Iqbal is a current dean and principal of SMME.

Departments

The school consists of three main departments, for mechanical engineering, robotics and intelligent machine engineering, and also biomedical mechanical and engineering sciences.

The mechanical engineering department consists of 16 professors and approximately 230 undergraduate students and 25 postgraduate students. The mission of the mechanical engineering program is to provide students with the fundamental knowledge, skills and professional experience necessary for successful careers in industrial or academic roles. This provides a platform for students to study and perform in a challenging environment. The department is equipped with almost all laboratory equipment necessary for undergraduate and postgraduate studies in the area of mechanical design and thermal fluids.

The robotics and intelligent machine engineering department was established in September 2011 as Pakistan's first academic initiative in the field of robotics and artificial intelligence. Mainly focused on postgraduate studies and research in robotics, mechatronics, machine intelligence, control systems, machine vision, and industrial automation, department faculty offer masters and doctoral degrees in the field. The department houses dedicated laboratories of robotics and intelligent systems engineering, machine vision, UAVs/aerial robotics, control systems, industrial automation, electronics, embedded systems, and computer-aided engineering whereas it is supported by the manufacturing resource center, rapid prototyping lab, and computer numerical control lab which facilitates mechanical fabrication of indigenously-designed robot prototypes at the school. These laboratories comprise equipment both for research as well as teaching purposes including mobile and humanoid robots, robotic arms of various types, stereo vision camera systems, robot designing kits, advanced microcontroller instrumentation, human brain–computer interface equipment, remote piloted helicopters, pneumatic/hydraulic workstations, PCB precision prototyping facilities as well as various models for experimentation into non-linear and adaptive control systems. These enable the student to get practical exposure to robotic technology.

The biomedical, mechanical, and engineering sciences department has masters of science degrees in biomedical sciences and biomedical engineering which.

References

External links
 SMME NUST official website

National University of Sciences & Technology
Engineering universities and colleges in Pakistan